The 1926 Arizona Wildcats football team represented the University of Arizona as an independent during the 1926 college football season. In their 12th season under head coach Pop McKale, the Wildcats compiled a 5–1–1 record, shut out four of seven opponents, and outscored all opponents, 143 to 18. The team captain was Robert E. Crouch.

In October 1926, Arizona's quarterback John "Button" Salmon died after being injured in a car crash. According to some reports, he told coach Pop McKale before dying: "Tell them.....tell the team to Bear Down." The phrase became the university's athletic motto.

Schedule

References

Arizona
Arizona Wildcats football seasons
Arizona Wildcats football